Claudio Matías Ramírez (born 14 March 1999) is an Argentine professional footballer who plays as an attacking midfielder for Godoy Cruz.

Club career
Ramírez's career started in 2016 with Ferro Carril Oeste, who had signed him from Club Master. A Primera B Nacional fixture with All Boys on 19 December saw Ramírez make his professional bow, coming off the bench at half-time for Facundo Affranchino as they won 3–1. He made six further appearances throughout the 2016–17 campaign, before featuring five times in 2017–18. After participating twice in 2018–19, Ramírez spent 2019–20 out on loan with Villa Dálmine. He made just three appearances, all off the bench against Sarmiento, Chacarita Juniors and Santamarina before returning to his parent club.

After scoring his first senior goal on what would be his final appearance for the club against Gimnasia y Esgrima on 17 January 2021, Ramírez terminated his contract with Ferro on 19 February in order to join Primera División side Godoy Cruz. After the player rejected advancements from Ferro for a new contract, which would've expired on 30 June, the two clubs agreed on a compensation deal worth $30,000.

International career
In May 2018, Ramírez was called up by the Argentina U19s for a friendly with Shandong Luneng U21s; a match which launched a cooperative agreement between the AFA and their Chinese counterparts.

Career statistics
.

Notes

References

External links

1999 births
Living people
Sportspeople from Buenos Aires Province
Argentine footballers
Association football midfielders
Primera Nacional players
Ferro Carril Oeste footballers
Villa Dálmine footballers
Godoy Cruz Antonio Tomba footballers